Qin Shaobo (b. 1982 in Guangxi) is a Chinese actor, acrobat and contortionist. His first performance took place when he was 11 years old which resulted in him wanting to make acting a career.

Qin's motion picture debut was in 2001, playing The Amazing Yen, Danny Ocean's "grease man", in the remake of Ocean's Eleven. He reprised the role in 2004 in Ocean's Twelve and again in the sequel Ocean's Thirteen. He returned to the role in the spin-off film Ocean's 8.

Filmography

References

External links

1982 births
Male actors from Guangxi
Chinese male film actors
Living people
Acrobats
Contortionists
21st-century Chinese male actors